The Straubing Tigers are a professional men's ice hockey team, based in Straubing, Germany, that competes in the Deutsche Eishockey Liga. Straubing plays its home games at the Eisstadion am Pulverturm, which has a capacity of 5,800 spectators.

Promoted to the DEL in 2006, and operating with one of the league's smallest budgets, the team could finish no better than twelfth before the 2011–12 DEL season, when it reached the semi-finals of the playoffs. Their greatest success so far is the qualification for the Champions Hockey League seasons 2020–21 (cancelled due to the COVID-19 pandemic) and 2022-23. Straubing finished first in the CHL group stage and reached the round of 16 against Frölunda HC.

History

Bann Straubing (1941–1943)
In 1941, the then 14-year-old Max Pielmaier and his friends Max Pellkofer and Harry Poiger founded the first hockey team in Straubing. The first official game took place on the first of February 1942 in Hof and was lost by a score of 0:1. In the following year there were several games against other Bavarian teams. The game against Landshut on 31 January. 1943 was the last game during the second World War, because the young players also had to join the military after that.

TSV 1861 Straubing (1946–1981)
After the end of the war the players of Bann Straubing decided to join the TSV 1861 Straubing. Their home games were played on a pond near the medieval Pulverturm (powder tower) in Straubing where the ice stadium Eisstadion am Pulverturm is located today.

The construction of the Eisstadion am Pulverturm began in 1967 and consisted of an open ice rink surrounded by stands. The first game in the new arena was played on the 13. November 1967 against Preussen Berlin. The TSV Straubing started their first Season in the Kunsteis-Bayernliga where they got to the second place. The TSV Straubing rose to the Regionalliga (3. league) in 1970 and the Oberliga (2. league) in 1971, but had to go back to the third league when the 2nd Bundesliga, which replaced the Oberliga, was founded with fewer teams than the Oberliga had. They got back to the 2nd Bundesliga in 1975 when they won the playoff finals against the EV Regensburg.

EHC Straubing (1981–2002)
The EHC Straubing was founded when the hockey team split from the TSV Straubing in 1981. The ice hocky stadium has belonged to the city of Straubing since the foundation of the EHC Straubing. Although the EHC reached the 7th place in the Season 1982/83 they had to start again in 4. league because of financial problems. The EHC Straubing adapted the nickname "Die Tiger" (the tigers) in 1994 and mainly played in the Oberliga (third league) until they rose back to the 2nd Bundesliga in the year 2000. The professional section split from the EHC Straubing when it had to register bankruptcy in April 2002 and the Straubing Tigers AG was founded. Since then the EHC trains the junior teams of the Straubing Tigers and also contains a hobby team.

Straubing Tigers (since 2002)
After Straubing lost the finals of the 2nd Bundesliga against EV Duisburg in 2005, they won the championship in 2006 and were promoted to the DEL for the first time in history. Straubing is by far the smallest town which has a team in the DEL and also has one of the lowest budgets in the entire league. When the Straubing Tigers reached a playoff rank for the first time in 2012 they miraculously won the quarter finals against the Grizzly Adams Wolfsburg with a sweep and got to the semi-finals where they lost to the later German champion Eisbären Berlin. With one of the lowest budgets in the entire league Straubing regularly manages to get to the playoffs since 2012 and even qualified for the Champions Hockey League when they finished in the top three in the 2019–20 season. Their first season in the CHL was cancelled due to the COVID-19 pandemic but they qualified again for the season 2022-2023, where they won the group stage and played against Frölunda HC in the round of 16.

Season records

Players

Current roster

References

External links
 

 
Ice hockey teams in Germany
Ice hockey teams in Bavaria
1941 establishments in Germany
Ice hockey clubs established in 1941
Straubing